Stefano Caruso (born 19 April 1987) is a former competitive ice dancer with dual German and Italian citizenship. Representing Germany with Tanja Kolbe, he won seven international medals and two German national silver medals. They placed eighth at the 2013 European Championships and competed at the 2014 Winter Olympics, finishing 19th. Earlier in his career, Caruso competed for Italy with Isabella Pajardi.

Personal life 
Stefano Caruso was born 19 April 1987 in Rome, Italy, to a Hungarian mother and a father from Naples. He moved to Milan in 2000. He studied languages and communication in Bergamo. In September 2013, he became a German citizen while retaining his Italian citizenship. In January 2014, he began working for the Bundeswehr's sports group.

Career

Early career 
Caruso started skating as an eight-year-old in Mentana, Rome. He trained in ice dance from the start and teamed up with Isabella Pajardi in 2000. They won the 2008 Italian national junior title and placed 9th at the 2008 World Junior Championships. After they split up in 2010, Caruso had tryouts with an American, Isabella Tobias, and a Canadian.

Partnership with Kolbe 
Caruso teamed up with Tanja Kolbe in 2010 to represent Germany. In their first season together, they took bronze at the 2010 Ice Challenge and at the 2011 German Championships.

In their second season together, Kolbe/Caruso won two international medals, gold at the 2011 NRW Trophy and bronze at the Istanbul Cup. They took the silver medal at the German Championships and were assigned to the 2012 European Championships where they finished 12th. The duo split up after the event but teamed up again in July 2012.

In the 2012–13 season, Kolbe/Caruso took silver again at the German Championships and earned another trip to the European Championships where they finished 8th. They won two international medals – bronze at both the New Year's Cup and Volvo Open Cup.

In the 2013–14 season, Kolbe/Caruso were invited to their first Grand Prix event, the 2013 Trophee Eric Bompard where they placed 7th. They added two more international medals to their collection – bronze at the 2013 Ondrej Nepela Trophy and Ice Challenge. In February 2014, Kolbe/Caruso competed at the Winter Olympics in Sochi and finished 19th. They announced the end of their partnership in June 2014.

Post-competitive career 
After ending his competitive career in 2014, Caruso began a coaching partnership with Barbara Fusar-Poli at Milan's Agorà ice rink. In November 2021, Berliner Zeitung reported that Caruso was facing allegations of misconduct from multiple students.

Programs

With Kolbe

With Pajardi

Competitive highlights 
GP = Grand Prix; JGP = Junior Grand Prix

With Kolbe for Germany

With Pajardi for Italy

References

External links 

 
 
 Tanja Kolbe / Stefano Caruso official website

Italian male ice dancers
German male ice dancers
1987 births
Living people
Sportspeople from Rome
Naturalized citizens of Germany
Figure skaters at the 2014 Winter Olympics
Olympic figure skaters of Germany
German people of Italian descent
21st-century Italian dancers
21st-century German dancers
Competitors at the 2009 Winter Universiade